Steven Robert Brown (born 6 December 1973) is an English former professional footballer. Born in Southend-on-Sea, he played for Southend United, Colchester United, Gillingham, Lincoln City and Macclesfield Town between 1992 and 1999 and made over 150 appearances in The Football League.

He started his career at his home town club Southend United but he was released in May 1993 and moved to their Essex rivals Colchester United, where he became the club's top scorer in the 1993–94 season. In March 1995 he moved to Gillingham in a swap with Robbie Reinelt. He did not get to play regularly for the club, however, and in 1995 he moved to Lincoln City where he stayed till 1998. After a brief stay at Macclesfield Town, he moved to Dover Athletic in 1999, helping the club to a 6th-place finish in the Conference.

References

External links

1973 births
English footballers
Sportspeople from Southend-on-Sea
Southend United F.C. players
Colchester United F.C. players
Gillingham F.C. players
Lincoln City F.C. players
Macclesfield Town F.C. players
Dover Athletic F.C. players
Kingstonian F.C. players
Living people
Association football forwards